Carlos Miguel Jiménez Airport  is a small airport that serves the city of Pilar, in the Ñeembucú Department of Paraguay.

Since 2005, the airport went through a major technological renovation.

See also
 List of airports in Paraguay

References

External links
 Direccion Nacional de Aeronautica Civil - Airports of Paraguay

Airports in Paraguay
Ñeembucú Department